was the 79th emperor of Japan, according to the traditional order of succession.  His reign spanned the years from 1165 through 1168.

Genealogy
Before his ascension to the Chrysanthemum Throne, his personal name (his imina) was Nobuhito-shinnō (順仁).  He was as Yoshihito- or Toshihito-shinnō.

He was the son of Emperor Nijō.  He left no children.

Events of Rokujō's life
He was made Crown Prince before his first birthday, and was enthroned at the age of 8 months.

 1165 (Eiman 1):  The infant son of Emperor Nijō was named heir apparent (and this Crown Prince will soon become Emperor Rokujō.
 1165 (Eiman 1, 25th day of the 6th month): In the 7th year of Nijō-tennōs reign (二条天皇七年), the emperor fell so very ill that he abdicated; and the succession (senso) was received by his son.  Shortly thereafter, Emperor Rokujō is said to have acceded to the throne (sokui).
 1165 (Eiman 1, 27th–28th day of the 7th month): The former- Emperor Nijō died at age 22.

He was pressured by the Taira clan to abdicate in favor of his uncle, who became Emperor Takakura.

 1168 (Nin'an 3, 19th day of the 2nd month): In the 3rd year of Rokujō-tennōs reign (六条天皇三年), the emperor was deposed by his grandfather, and the succession (‘‘senso’’) was received by his uncle, the seventh son of the retired-Emperor Go-Shirakawa.
 1168 (Nin'an 3, 19th day of the 2nd month):  Emperor Takakura is said to have acceded to the throne (‘‘sokui’’), and he is proclaimed emperor.
 1168 (Nin'an 3, 20th day of the 3rd month): Takakura succeeds Rokujo on the Chrysanthemum Throne.

Rokujō died at the age of eleven.  Because of his youth, he had neither consorts nor children.  Government affairs were run by his grandfather, Retired Emperor Go-Shirakawa as cloistered emperor. His imperial mausoleum is designated as Seikanji no misasagi (清閑寺陵), located in Higashiyama-ku, Kyoto.

Kugyō
Kugyō (公卿) is a collective term for the very few most powerful men attached to the court of the Emperor of Japan in pre-Meiji eras.

In general, this elite group included only three to four men at a time.  These were hereditary courtiers whose experience and background would have brought them to the pinnacle of a life's career.  During Rokujō's reign, this apex of the  Daijō-kan included:
 Sesshō, Konoe Motozane, 1143–1166.
 Sesshō, Matsu Motofusa, 1144–1230.
 Daijō-daijin, Fujiwara Koremichi 1093–1165.
 Daijō-daijin, Taira Kiyomori, 1118–1181.
 Sadaijin, Matsu Motofusa.
 Sadaijin, Ōinomikado Tsunemune, 1119–1189.
 Udaijin, Kujō Kanezane, 1149–1207.
 Nadaijin, Fujiwara Tadamasa.
 Dainagon

Eras of Emperor Rokujō's reign
The years of Rokujō's reign are more specifically identified by more than one era name or nengō.
 Eiman          (1165–1166)

Ancestry

See also
 Emperor of Japan
 List of Emperors of Japan
 Imperial cult

Notes

References
 Brown, Delmer M. and Ichirō Ishida, eds. (1979).  Gukanshō: The Future and the Past. Berkeley: University of California Press. ; OCLC 251325323
 Helmolt, Hans Ferdinand and James Bryce Bryce. (1907). The World's History: A Survey of Man's Progress. Vol. 2.  London: William Heinemann.OCLC 20279012
 Kitagawa, Hiroshi and Burce T. Tsuchida, ed. (1975). The Tale of the Heike. Tokyo: University of Tokyo Press.  OCLC 164803926
 Ponsonby-Fane, Richard Arthur Brabazon. (1959).  The Imperial House of Japan. Kyoto: Ponsonby Memorial Society. OCLC 194887
 Titsingh, Isaac. (1834). Nihon Odai Ichiran; ou,  Annales des empereurs du Japon.  Paris: Royal Asiatic Society, Oriental Translation Fund of Great Britain and Ireland. OCLC 5850691
 Varley, H. Paul. (1980). Jinnō Shōtōki: A Chronicle of Gods and Sovereigns. New York: Columbia University Press. ; OCLC 59145842

Japanese emperors
1164 births
1176 deaths
12th-century Japanese monarchs
People of Heian-period Japan
Monarchs who died as children